Eduard Spranger (27 June 1882 – 17 September 1963) was a German philosopher and psychologist. A student of Wilhelm Dilthey, Spranger was born in Berlin and died in Tübingen.  He was considered a humanist who developed a philosophical pedagogy as an act of 'self defense' against the psychology-oriented experimental theory of the times.

Spranger was the author of the book Lebensformen (Translated as Types of Men), which sold 28,000 copies by the end of 1920. Spranger theorizes that types of human life are structures in consciousness. His belief was that personality types have a basis in biology, but can not be fully explained by biology.  He wrote, "On a lower level, perhaps, the soul is purely biologically determined.  On a higher level, the historical, for instance, the soul participates in objective values which cannot be deduced from the simple value of self-preservation."  He criticized psychologists who reduced the psyche and society to abstract elements of science. Another characteristic of Spranger's thought is his interest in holism, which involves the discovery that "everything is part of everything else," and that the "totality of mind is present in every act." He asserts that quantitative calculations of sensations, reflexes, and citations from memory are meaningless units, that when synthesized, do not add up to the meaningful whole that we all live.

Thought
Spranger evaluated personalities in terms of six ideals or value orientations; theoretical, economic, aesthetic, social, political and religious "types" of personality traits.

Spranger contributed to the pedagogy of personality theory, in his book Types of Men. His value attitudes were: 
The Theoretical, whose dominant interest is the discovery of truth
The Economic, who is interested in what is useful
The Aesthetic, whose highest value is form and harmony
The Social, whose highest value is love of people
The Political, whose interest is primarily in power
The Religious, whose highest value is unity 

Those six in more detail are:

Theoretical: A passion to discover, systemize and analyze; a search for knowledge.

Utilitarian: A passion to gain a return on all investments involving time, money and resources.

Aesthetic: A passion to experience impressions of the world and achieve form and harmony in life; self-actualization.

Social: A passion to invest myself, my time, and my resources into helping others achieve their potential.

Individualistic: A passion to achieve position and to use that position to affect and influence others.

Traditional: A passion to seek out and pursue the highest meaning in life, in the divine or the ideal, and achieve a system for living. This instrument is sometimes offered along with the DISC assessment.

References

External links
 

1882 births
1963 deaths
Writers from Berlin
German psychologists
People from the Province of Brandenburg
Recipients of the Pour le Mérite (civil class)
Academic staff of Leipzig University
Academic staff of the Humboldt University of Berlin
Academic staff of the University of Tübingen
Grand Crosses with Star and Sash of the Order of Merit of the Federal Republic of Germany
German male writers
Members of the German Academy of Sciences at Berlin
20th-century psychologists